Monica Pellecer Alecio is a Guatemalan archaeologist who in 2005 led a team that found the oldest known Maya royal tomb to date, belonging to an early Maya king (150BC). It was uncovered beneath a small pyramid at San Bartolo.

References

Guatemalan Mesoamericanists
Women Mesoamericanists
Mesoamerican archaeologists
21st-century Mesoamericanists
Living people
Guatemalan archaeologists
Guatemalan women archaeologists
21st-century Guatemalan women writers
Year of birth missing (living people)